Luigi Lucotti (December 18, 1893 in Voghera – December 29, 1980 in Voghera) was an Italian road bicycle racer who has won three stages in the Tour de France and a stage at the Giro d'Italia.

Major results

1914
 3rd overall – Giro d’Italia
 1st, Stage 6
1919
 7th overall – Tour de France
 1st, Stage 12, Genève > Strasbourg
 1st, Stage 13, Strasbourg > Metz
1921 – Ancora
 4th overall – Tour de France, @ +2 hours 39 minutes 18 seconds
 1st, Stage 8, Perpignan > Toulon

References

Italian male cyclists
Italian Tour de France stage winners
1893 births
1980 deaths
People from Voghera
Cyclists from the Province of Pavia